USS Banaag was a harbor tug of the United States Navy that served during World War II.

History
She was laid down at the Hong Kong shipyard of Hong Kong and Whampoa Dock Company Ltd. as a copper-sheathed composite hull tug for the benefit of the United States Navy. On 1 February 1911, she was delivered and commissioned at the Olongapo Naval Station, 16th Naval District, United States Asiatic Fleet. On 17 July 1920, she was designated as District Harbor Tug YT-104. She is believed to have been destroyed during the Japanese occupation of the Olongapo Naval Station on 25 December 1941. Her 3-pounder gun had previously been removed and given to the 4th Marine Regiment during the Battle of Bataan. 

On 24 July 1942, she was struck from the Naval Register and listed as "lost due to enemy occupation".

References

1910 ships
Ships built in Hong Kong
Ships built by the Hong Kong & Whampoa Dock Company
Ships of the United States Navy